Hai Hui Babi Achchi is a 2004 Sri Lankan Sinhala comedy masala film directed by Herbert Ranjith Peiris and produced by Lalindra Wijewickrama for Lalindra Films. It stars Bandu Samarasinghe in lead role along with Sanjeewa Mallawarachchi, Gemunu Wijesuriya, and Quintus Weerakoon. Music composed by Sarath de Alwis. It is the 956th Sri Lankan film in the Sinhala cinema.

Plot

Cast
 Bandu Samarasinghe as Sahabandu 'Miss Dimple Mylawa'
 Gemunu Wijesuriya as Baby C. Walgampaya 'Babi Achchi'
 Quintus Weerakoon as Talwathu Mohandiramge Bandara Kimbulapitiya
 Sanjeewa Mallawarachchi as Rupika
 Rathna Sumanapala as Dottie Auntie 'Chin Chin Nona'
 Wimal Kumara de Costa as Costa
 Sunil Hettiarachchi as Pussella 
 Ronnie Leitch as Malu Kade Jora 'Wickramabahu Podi Appu'
 Sunil Perera as Bele Kade Saima 'Kapirimudukuwe Gotaimbre'
 Anura Bandara Rajaguru as Titty Boy
 Sasanthi Jayasekara as Payodara
 Swarnamali Jayalath as Yasodara

Soundtrack

References

2001 films
2000s Sinhala-language films
2001 comedy films
Sri Lankan comedy films